Kang Man-young  (born June 14, 1962, in South Korea) is a South Korean footballer and current FC Dallas youth coach.

Club career 
He played for FC Seoul. (then knowns as Lucky-Goldstar FC)

Managing career  
He was manager of Bangladesh national football team in 1995. Under his guidance Bangladesh were eliminated from semi-final of the 1995 South Asian Gold Cup, losing to India in penalties. He left after the tournament concluded, and German coach Otto Pfister replaced him at the job.

In 1995 during his stay in Bangladesh, Kang was put incharge of Mohammedan Sporting Club as caretaker manager. He guided the club to the 1996 Dhaka Premier Division League trophy as undefeated champions.

He was re-appointed as Mohammedan Sporting Club manager in December 2004.

Honours 
 Mohammedan SC
Dhaka Premier Division League Champions: 1996

 Lucky-Goldstar FC
Korean National Football Championship Champions: 1988

References

External links
 

South Korean footballers
1962 births
Living people
FC Seoul players
FC Seoul non-playing staff
K League 1 players
Association football scouts
Association football forwards
South Korean football managers
South Korean expatriate football managers
Bangladesh national football team managers
Expatriate football managers in Bangladesh